Group Captain Peter Wooldridge Townsend,  (22 November 1914 – 19 June 1995) was a British Royal Air Force officer, flying ace, courtier and author. He was equerry to King George VI from 1944 to 1952 and held the same position for Queen Elizabeth II from 1952 to 1953. Townsend notably had a romance with Princess Margaret, Elizabeth's younger sister.

Early life
Townsend was born in Rangoon, Burma, to doctor's son Lieutenant Colonel Edward Copleston Townsend, of the Indian Army, and his wife, Gladys, daughter of H. Hatt-Cook, of Hartford Hall, Cheshire; his father had married aged 42, 20 years older than his bride. The Townsend family, of Devon, tended to send its sons into the church or the armed forces.

From 1928 to 1932, Townsend was educated at Haileybury and Imperial Service College, then an all-boys private school.

RAF career
Townsend joined the Royal Air Force in 1930 and trained at RAF Cranwell. He was commissioned a pilot officer on 27 July 1935. On graduation, he joined No. 1 Squadron RAF at RAF Tangmere flying the Hawker Fury biplane fighter. In 1936 he was posted to No. 36 Squadron RAF in Singapore, flying the Vickers Vildebeest torpedo bomber. He was promoted to flying officer on 27 January 1937, and returned to Tangmere that year as a member of No. 43 Squadron RAF. Townsend was promoted to flight lieutenant on 27 January 1939.

The first enemy aircraft to crash on English soil during the Second World War fell victim to fighters from RAF Acklington in Northumberland on 3 February 1940, when three Hurricanes of 'B' flight, No. 43 Squadron, shot down a Luftwaffe Heinkel 111 of 4./KG 26 near Whitby. The pilots were Flight Lieutenant Townsend, Flying Officer "Tiger" Folkes and Sergeant James Hallowes. Two more He 111s were claimed by Townsend, on 22 February and 8 April, and a sixth share on 22 April. Enemy aircraft had been shot down in 1939 by the RAF from over Scotland's Scapa Flow naval base during the Luftwaffe's first raid on Britain. Townsend was awarded the Distinguished Flying Cross (DFC) in April 1940:

By May 1940, Townsend was one of the most capable squadron leaders of the Battle of Britain, serving throughout the battle as commanding officer of No. 85 Squadron RAF, flying Hawker Hurricanes. On 11 July 1940, Acting Squadron Leader Townsend, flying Hurricane VY-K (P2716) intercepted a Dornier Do 17 of KG 2 and severely damaged the bomber, forcing it to crash land at Arras. Return fire from the Dornier hit the Hurricane coolant system and Townsend was forced to ditch  from the English coast, being rescued by HM Trawler Cape Finisterre. He was mentioned in despatches the same month. On 31 August, during combat with Messerschmitt Bf 110s over Tonbridge, Townsend was shot down and wounded in the left foot by a cannon shell which went through the glycol tank and exploded in the cockpit. He continued to lead the unit on the ground even after this wound resulted in his big toe being amputated, and he returned to operational flying on 21 September. Townsend was promoted to the substantive rank of squadron leader on 1 September 1940. A Bar to his DFC was awarded in early September 1940, for leading his squadron in protecting convoys during July and August 1940, personally shooting down four enemy aircraft and leading his squadron in destroying at least 10 enemy aircraft and damaging many others. Part of his citation reads:

Townsend oversaw the conversion of No. 85 Squadron to night operations at RAF Hunsdon in Hertfordshire during early 1941. In May 1941, by now an acting wing commander and credited with shooting down at least 11 enemy aircraft, Townsend was awarded the Distinguished Service Order (DSO). His citation credited Townsend as an officer who had

Townsend was promoted to the temporary rank of wing commander on 1 December 1941. He later became commanding officer of RAF Drem in Scotland in April 1942 and commanded No. 611 Squadron RAF, a Spitfire unit. He was later leader of No. 605 Squadron RAF, a night fighter unit, and attended the staff college from October 1942. In January 1943, he was appointed commanding officer of RAF West Malling in Kent. His wartime record was nine aircraft claimed destroyed, and two shared, two 'probables' and four damaged.

In 1944, Townsend was appointed temporary equerry to King George VI; the officer had been the future king's flight instructor in the 1930s. In the same year, the appointment was made permanent, and he served until 1953 when he became Extra Equerry, an honorary office he held until his death. He ended his wartime service with the temporary rank of wing commander and was promoted to the permanent rank of wing commander on 1 January 1949.

In August 1950, Townsend was made deputy Master of the Household and was moved to comptroller to the Queen Mother in 1952. He was promoted to group captain on 1 January 1953, and retired from the Royal Household the same year.

Townsend served as air attaché in Brussels from 1953 to 1956.

Later life
Townsend spent much of his later years writing non-fiction books. His books include Earth My Friend (about driving/boating around the world alone in the mid-1950s), Duel of Eagles (about the Battle of Britain), The Odds Against Us (also known as Duel in the Dark, about fighting Luftwaffe night bombers in 1940–1941), The Last Emperor (a biography of King George VI), The Girl in the White Ship (about a young refugee from Vietnam in the late 1970s who was the sole survivor of her ship of refugees), The Postman of Nagasaki (about the atomic bombing of Nagasaki), and Time and Chance (an autobiography). He also wrote many short articles and contributed to other books.

Townsend was a director of one of Gerald Carroll's Carroll Group companies.

Townsend was one of several military advisors for the film Battle of Britain (1969). He also appeared in the PBS video The Windsors: A Royal Family (1994).

Personal life
On 17 July 1941, Townsend married (Cecil) Rosemary Pawle (1921–2004). They had two sons, Giles (1942–2015) and Hugo (b. 1945). The family was resident in Adelaide Cottage in the 1940s. The younger son married Yolande, Princess of Ligne, daughter of Antoine, 13th Prince of Ligne and Alix, Princess of Ligne (née Princess Alix of Luxembourg). Townsend and Pawle divorced in 1952.

After the divorce, Townsend and Princess Margaret decided to marry. He had met her in his role as an equerry to her father, King George VI. Divorcees suffered severe disapproval in the social atmosphere of the time and could not remarry in the Church of England if their former spouse was still alive. Their relationship was considered especially controversial because Margaret's sister, Queen Elizabeth II, was the Church's supreme governor.

When news of the relationship appeared in the press, the government posted Townsend to a position as air attaché at the British Embassy in Brussels. On 31 October 1955, Princess Margaret issued a statement ending the relationship: "I have been aware that, subject to my renouncing my rights of succession, it might have been possible for me to contract a civil marriage. But, mindful of the Church's teachings that Christian marriage is indissoluble, and conscious of my duty to the Commonwealth, I have resolved to put these considerations before others." The BBC interrupted its scheduled radio programme to broadcast the statement.

In 1959, aged 45, Townsend married 20-year-old Marie-Luce Jamagne, a Belgian national he had met the previous year. They had two daughters and one son. Their younger daughter, Isabelle Townsend, became a Ralph Lauren model in the late 1980s and early 1990s. Isabelle Townsend and her family renovated and lived at Le Moulin de la Tuilerie in Gif-sur-Yvette, where the Duke and Duchess of Windsor had once lived.

Death and legacy

Townsend died of stomach cancer in 1995, in Saint-Léger-en-Yvelines, France, at the age of 80. The Independent wrote in Townsend's obituary that "He developed, too, a perceptible sense of relief that things turned out the way they did", because "for men like Mark Phillips and Princess Margaret's eventual husband Anthony Armstrong-Jones, [marrying into the royal family] turned out to be an almost impossible undertaking".

In 2002, a sculpture of Townsend, designed by Guy Portelli, was erected at Townsend Square, part of the Kings Hill development, on the site formerly occupied by the RAF West Malling airfield.

In popular culture
Townsend is portrayed by Ben Miles and Timothy Dalton in the Netflix television series The Crown.

Selected works

References

External links

 
 
 
 New York Times obituary on Peter Townsend

1914 births
1995 deaths
British air attachés
British expatriates in France
British non-fiction writers
British World War II flying aces
Commanders of the Royal Victorian Order
Companions of the Distinguished Service Order
Deaths from stomach cancer
Equerries
People educated at Haileybury and Imperial Service College
People from Yangon
Recipients of the Distinguished Flying Cross (United Kingdom)
Royal Air Force group captains
Royal Air Force pilots of World War II
The Few
20th-century non-fiction writers
Deaths from cancer in France
Male lovers of royalty